David Dunne may refer to:
 David Dunne (DJ), British DJ and radio presenter
 David Dunne (swimmer) (born 1955), British former swimmer
 David Dunne (hurler) (born 1995), Irish hurler

See also
 David Dunn (disambiguation)